Peter Ambrose Cyprian Luke MC (12 August 1919 – 23 January 1995) was a British writer, editor, and producer.

Early years
Luke was born in St Albans, he was the first son of Sir Harry Luke and his wife Joyce Evelyn Fremlin. He had wanted to be a painter, and went to art school for two years before World War II broke out. He was awarded the Military Cross for his service during the war. Some time after, he worked under producer Sydney Newman on the British television drama anthology Armchair Theatre, as a story editor. In 1967, he adapted Frederick Rolfe's novel Hadrian the Seventh for the stage. In 1984, he published a solitary novel The Other Side of the Hill set during the Peninsular War. This was adapted into a BBC radio drama in 1993 with Michael Pennington and John Moffat, and directed by Glyn Dearman.

He was married to Carola Peyton-Jones (deceased), then Lettice Crawshaw (one daughter, one son deceased; marriage dissolved), and finally June Tobin (two sons, three daughters).

He died in Cadiz on 23 January 1995.

Timeline of events
1946–47 - Sub-editor, Reuters News Desk
1947–57 - Wine trader 
1958–62 - Story editor, ABC Weekend TV 
1962–63 - Editor, arts series The Bookman (ABC TV) 
1963–64 - Editor, Tempo (ABC TV) 
1963–68 - Drama producer, writer and director BBC TV 
1977–80 - Director, Edwards-Mac Liammoir Dublin Gate Theatre Company

List of works
 1967 - Hadrian the Seventh
 1974 - Bloomsbury
 1977 - Rings for a Spanish Lady
 1978 - Proxopera
 1985 - Married Love: The Apotheosis of Marie Stopes
 1987 - Yerma
 1993 - The Other Side of the Hill; BBC radio drama based on his only novel

References

External links
Obituary in The Independent

1919 births
1995 deaths
20th-century British writers
People from St Albans
Rifle Brigade officers
British Army personnel of World War II
Recipients of the Military Cross